Hazel Green Township is a township in Delaware County, Iowa, USA.  As of the 2000 census, its population was 408.

History
Hazel Green Township was established in 1857.

Geography
Hazel Green Township covers an area of 36.04 square miles (93.34 square kilometers). The stream of Golden Branch runs through this township.

Cities and towns
 Ryan (east edge)

Adjacent townships
 Milo Township (north)
 Delhi Township (northeast)
 Union Township (east)
 Castle Grove Township, Jones County (southeast)
 Boulder Township, Linn County (south)
 Jackson Township, Linn County (southwest)
 Adams Township (west)
 Prairie Township (northwest)

Cemeteries
The township contains three cemeteries: Calvary, Golden Prairie and Peace.

Major highways

References
 U.S. Board on Geographic Names (GNIS)
 United States Census Bureau cartographic boundary files

External links
 US-Counties.com
 City-Data.com

Townships in Delaware County, Iowa
Townships in Iowa
1857 establishments in Iowa
Populated places established in 1857